Robert Wolf may refer to:

 Robert Wolf (writer) (born c. 1944), American journalist and co-founder of Free River Press
 Robert Wolf (business) (born 1962), Chairman and CEO, UBS Group Americas, President and COO Investment Bank of UBS AG
 Robert Wolf (swimmer) (born 1971), Czech swimmer
 Robert A. Wolf (born 1961), American electronic musician and film composer

See also
Robert Wolfe (disambiguation)
Robert Wolff (disambiguation)